Sigalionidae is a family of polychaetes belonging to the order Phyllodocida.

Genera

Genera:
 Anoplopisione Laubier, 1967
 Claparedepelogenia Pettibone, 1997
 Dayipsammolyce Pettibone, 1997

References

Phyllodocida